Under a Raging Moon is the sixth solo studio album by English singer Roger Daltrey, released in September 1985 by Atlantic Records. The album reached No. 42 on the US charts, and the single "After the Fire", written by Pete Townshend, reached No. 48. It includes a tribute to Keith Moon, former drummer of the Who who died in 1978, on the track "Under a Raging Moon". In Canada, the album reached No. 33 on the RPM Magazine charts, and "After the Fire" reached No. 53.

The album was produced by Alan Shacklock, recorded at RAK Recording Studios and Odyssey Studios, London, and released on Atlantic Records in the US. Later the album was also released on CD (Atlantic 7 81269-1) in the US, including the bonus track "Love Me Like You Do", written by Andy Nye.

The track "Under a Raging Moon" was written by John Parr and Julia Downes. It was said that John Entwistle had wanted to play this song instead of "Won't Get Fooled Again" at Live Aid in 1985 with the Who, but Pete Townshend disagreed so Entwistle decided to record his own version on his live solo album Left for Live (1999) as a further tribute to Moon.

The album featured Zak Starkey playing drums; this was Starkey's second album that he had worked on, the other being Sun City released in the same year by Artists United Against Apartheid.

Daltrey later recalled "That was the album I really wanted to make ... it got great airplay and sold an awful lot."

Critical reception

Mike DeGagne of AllMusic wrote about the title track: "Daltrey's thunderous but passionate ode to his former friend and drummer Keith Moon is a fervent downpour of frustration that can be truly felt inside every line of the song. A spectacular drum solo from Mark Brzezicki is a modest tribute to the late Moon and adds depth indefinitely."

Track listing

Extra track released on CD and cassette, not LP
This track was included as track six on the album, but only on the CD and cassette editions, not the record. The track was later released as the B-side to Daltrey's 1986 single, "Quicksilver Lightning", the theme to the Kevin Bacon film Quicksilver.

Personnel
Musicians
 Roger Daltrey – lead vocals, harmony vocals (Track 1), backing vocals (Track 11), sequencing (Tracks 2, 11), emulator (Tracks 3–5), Hammond organ (Track 7)
 Mark Brzezicki – drums, triangle and cabasa (Track 2), percussion (Track 3)
 Tony Butler – bass (Track 1)
 Robbie McIntosh – guitars (Tracks 1–6, 8–11), Strat-solo (Track 2), solo (Tracks 6, 7), slide solo (Track 10)
 Bryan Adams – guitars 
 Nick Glennie-Smith – keyboards (Tracks 1–3, 8, 11)
 John Siegler – bass (Tracks 2–11)
 Mark Feltham – harmonica (Tracks 5, 9)
 Alan Shacklock – piano (Tracks 1, 6, 10), keyboards (Tracks 2, 3, 11), sequencing (Tracks 2, 11), emulator (Track 3), percussion (Track 4), Hammond organ (Tracks 6, 10), Fender Rhodes (Track 6), tambourine (Track 7), sampling (Track 8), acoustic guitar and sequencer (Track 10), Fairlight (Track 11)
 Bruce Watson – E-bow (Track 1)
 Russ Ballard – guitar and harmony vocals (Track 3)
 Mark Williamson – harmony vocals (Tracks 2, 6), backing vocals (Tracks 3–5, 7, 8, 11)
 Annie McCraig – backing vocals (Tracks 3–5, 7, 8, 11)
 John Payne – backing vocals (Tracks 3–5, 7, 8, 11)
 John Parr – backing vocals (Track 11)
 Steve Rance – Fairlight CMI (Track 11)
 On track 10, drummers in order of performance:
 Martin Chambers
 Roger Taylor
 Cozy Powell
 Stewart Copeland
 Zak Starkey
 Carl Palmer
 Mark Brzezicki
 Mark Brzezicki and Zak Starkey – outro

Technical
 Will Gosling – recording
 Graham Hughes – sleeve concept, photography

Singles chart position
"After The Fire" No. 48, 1985
"Let Me Down Easy" No. 86, 1986

See also
Roger Daltrey discography

References

External links
 

1985 albums
Roger Daltrey albums
Atlantic Records albums
Albums recorded at RAK Studios
Albums produced by Alan Shacklock